Coleophora zukowskii is a moth of the family Coleophoridae. It is found in Poland and Denmark.

References

zukowskii
Moths of Europe
Moths described in 1959